Alexander Richards (born August 12, 1995) is an American rower. He competed in the men's eight event at the 2020 Summer Olympics.

References

External links
 
 Harvard Crimson bio

1995 births
Living people
American male rowers
Olympic rowers of the United States
Rowers at the 2020 Summer Olympics
Harvard Crimson rowers
People from Watertown, Massachusetts